Bashuchelys is an extinct genus of bashuchelyid Middle Jurassic turtle from the Sichuan Basin in the People's Republic of China. As of 2011, it is the only known genus of the family Bashuchelyidae.

References

Prehistoric animals of China
Cryptodira
Jurassic turtles